"Wasted Time" is a song by Australian singer-songwriter Vance Joy, the song is included on his debut studio album Dream Your Life Away (2014). It is the third track on the album. The track was never released as a single, however, it managed to peak at number 43 on the Australian Singles Chart, and number 50 on the Canadian Hot 100.

Chart performance

References

2014 singles
2014 songs
Vance Joy songs
Songs written by Vance Joy